The Town of Hull is located in Marathon County, Wisconsin, United States. It is part of the Wausau, Wisconsin, Metropolitan Statistical Area. The population was 750 at the 2010 census. The unincorporated community of Cherokee is located in the town.

History
The town of Hull was named for David B. Hull who was one of the original settlers in the area.

Geography
According to the United States Census Bureau, the town has a total area of 32.6 square miles (84.5 km), of which 32.6 square miles (84.3 km) is land and 0.1 square miles (0.2 km), or 0.21%, is water.

Demographics
At the 2000 census there were 773 people, 256 households, and 210 families living in the town. The population density was 23.7 people per square mile (9.2/km). There were 260 housing units at an average density of 8.0 per square mile (3.1/km).  The racial makeup of the town was 98.84% White, 0.78% from other races, and 0.39% from two or more races. Hispanic or Latino of any race were 0.91%.

Of the 256 households 40.2% had children under the age of 18 living with them, 74.2% were married couples living together, 2.7% had a female householder with no husband present, and 17.6% were non-families. 13.7% of households were one person and 4.3% were one person aged 65 or older. The average household size was 3.02 and the average family size was 3.34.

The age distribution was 30.5% under the age of 18, 7.9% from 18 to 24, 28.2% from 25 to 44, 23.3% from 45 to 64, and 10.1% 65 or older. The median age was 36 years. For every 100 females, there were 112.4 males. For every 100 females age 18 and over, there were 115.7 males.

The median household income was $41,324 and the median family income  was $45,096. Males had a median income of $26,319 versus $20,625 for females. The per capita income for the town was $17,068. About 3.5% of families and 5.6% of the population were below the poverty line, including 8.8% of those under age 18 and 2.4% of those age 65 or over.

References

Towns in Marathon County, Wisconsin
Towns in Wisconsin